William H. Taylor was a Major League Baseball player for the Louisville Colonels in . He played in nine games, mostly at third base, going 6-for-24 with 2 RBI.

Sources

Major League Baseball third basemen
Louisville Colonels players
Baseball players from Kentucky
1870 births
1905 deaths
19th-century baseball players
People from Pendleton County, Kentucky